John Francis Nicholas Mayhew (6 December 1909 in India – 31 January 1999 in Brandon, Manitoba, Canada) was an English cricketer. A right-handed batsman and wicket-keeper, he played first-class cricket for Oxford University between 1929 and 1931.

Career

First-class cricket

Mayhew made his first-class debut for Oxford University in 1929 against Derbyshire, the only match he played that year. He played eleven matches for them in 1930, including a match against Australia, gaining his blue against Cambridge University in July. He played twice for them in 1931, against Yorkshire and Kent.

Other cricket

In November 1933, Mayhew played for Shanghai in a three-day match against Malaya played in Hong Kong. He also played minor counties cricket for Buckinghamshire in 1947 and 1948.

References

1909 births
1999 deaths
English cricketers
Oxford University cricketers
Buckinghamshire cricketers
Alumni of Brasenose College, Oxford
Sportspeople from Brandon, Manitoba
British people in colonial India